Jorge Arganis Díaz Leal (born 20 April 1943) is a civil engineer and current Secretary of Communications and Transportation of Mexico.

In October 2021, he was named in the Pandora Papers leak.

Career 
He studied Civil Engineering at the Faculty of Engineering of the National Autonomous University of Mexico. He obtained a diploma in Construction Administration (CMIC) and also had studies in Project Management and Business Development.

In 1963, he was appointed as Director General of Projects and Laboratories of the Secretariat of Public Works of National Autonomous University of Mexico. In 1971 he worked as Technical Advisor of Pemex. From 1977 to 1997 he worked in Ingenieros Civiles Asociados. From 2002 to 2006 he was Director General of Public Work in the administration of Andrés Manuel López Obrador as Head of Government of the Federal District.

References 

1943 births
Living people
Mexican engineers
Mexican Secretaries of Communications and Transportation
Cabinet of Andrés Manuel López Obrador
21st-century Mexican politicians
People named in the Pandora Papers